Ben Ammi Ben-Israel (October 12, 1939 – December 27, 2014) was the American-born founder and spiritual leader of the African Hebrew Israelites of Jerusalem.

Biography
Ben Carter (later Ben Ammi Ben-Israel) was born in Chicago, Illinois, to a Baptist family. After dropping out of high school, Carter served three years in the United States Army, where he earned an equivalency degree.

After Carter was discharged from the Army, he worked as a metallurgist at Chicago's Howard Foundry. In 1961, a co-worker introduced him to the idea that African Americans are descendants of the Biblical Israelites. Carter began to attend meetings of black Israelite groups, and was given a Hebrew name, Ben Ammi Ben-Israel.

According to the Hebrew Israelite community, in 1966, Ben Ammi received a vision from the angel Gabriel, who told him to lead African-Americans to Israel. In the vision, he claimed he was instructed to: "Lead the children of Israel among African Americans to the promised land, and establish the long-awaited Kingdom of God." In any case, Ben Ammi was one of four members of the Abeta Hebrew Israel Cultural Center to be chosen to travel to Liberia to explore the possibility of settlement there.

In July 1967, a number of Abeta families began to arrive in Liberia, settling in spartan conditions on land purchased by an African American citizen of Liberia on behalf of the community. According to one account, Ben Ammi began his rise to leadership within the group around Passover in 1968. In accordance with their belief that they were the descendants of ancient Israelites, community members planned to sacrifice a lamb or kid (baby goat) as part of the observance of the holiday. When the goat acquired for the occasion was found accidentally strangled, and therefore ritually impure to be used as a sacrifice, Ben Ammi made a speech declaring that the faith and observance of the Black Hebrews was the true sacrifice that God desired.

The Abeta settlers were not welcomed by the Liberian government, and suffered from economic and social difficulties. Many of them died from diseases. In 1969, Ben Ammi visited Israel to once again explore the possibility the group's relocation.

According to Ben Ammi, tickets were purchased for their move to Israel with the proceeds from the sale of two ice cream shops established for the group's benefit in Monrovia, as well as "divine intelligence." In 1970, 48 families became new immigrants  under Israel's Law of Return. Ben Ammi and more of his followers arrived in the ensuing months, settling in the Negev city of Dimona. Others settled in Arad and Mitzpe Ramon The community was eventually given permanent residency in 1990,  and later were entitled to acquire Israeli citizenship by naturalization, which does not imply any Jewish status. Ben Ammi served as the community's spiritual and political leader during this time, authoring a number of books.

Ben Ammi died in a hospital in Be'er Sheva. At the time of his death, Ben Ammi had four wives—Tikvah, Yoninah, Baht Zion and Baht Ammi, as well as 25 children, 45 grandchildren, and 15 great-grandchildren.

Teachings
Ben Ammi claimed that he and the Black Hebrews from the original Liberian settlement were not Jews but Hebrews, the true descendants of the ancient Israelites. Ben Ammi originally believed that Moses and Abraham were black, and that the Black Hebrews were the only "true" inheritors of Israel.

While rejecting the modern religious forms of both Judaism and Christianity, he maintained the divine inspiration of the Tanakh, and perceived Yeshua as one of an ongoing line of 'messiahs' sent by God to keep the people of Israel in the ways of righteousness. The core of the group's lifestyle is the Tanakh, Ben Ammi claimed that "the Law and the Prophets...are the light; they are the essence of what is required to set man on the path and show him the way back to his Maker." However the group reject the traditions of Rabbinic Judaism including the Talmud as inauthentic to Hebrew religion.

Ben Ammi claimed that Africans are the victims of "a cruel plot to control us, an international religious plot that came about as a result of Blacks disobeying the law and commandments of God." In the attempt to overcome the history of slavery and the bondage in America, Ammi argues that it is essential to "reexamine and redefine all things...we must question every facet of existence under Euro-gentile dominion." The ability to name and classify the word and social concepts Ammi calls "The Power to Define", which in the wrong hands is "one of the greatest weapons that can be used to control men and nations," but is the key to salvation from past oppression.

Ben Ammi translated his perspective of Africa's problems being "spiritual problems" into an expansive set of socio-political, economic, agricultural and health-related positions. He emphasized the need for African Leaders to "learn from their history and the African Cultural Value System", in order to combat the "perception engineering" which is conducted by many Western institutions.

During a 2002 interview with Rob Redding of the Redding News Review, Ben Ammi expressed confidence in his community's ability to persevere even without him. When asked "What are the provisions within the community, to take care of the community, should something happen to you?" he responded "It is the word that I speak, the truth that I speak, that is deeply embedded in their souls...I am flesh, blood, and spirit - but it is the spirit I possess; the spirit the ancient prophets possess, that is of such significance to the redemption of our people." Defining himself as a "representative" of this Holy Spirit, Ben Ammi carefully distinguished the community from a sect or cult that risked social or political disintegration as a result of his absence, citing the long-term implications of Daniel 2:44 for biblical reference 

Ben-Israel was revered as a messianic figure in the community, his picture adorning at least one wall in every apartment. In an interview, Ben Ammi described his status as a spiritual leader:

According to the Hebrew Israelite community, singer and then actress Whitney Houston claimed Ben-Israel as her spiritual father.

Awards and recognition
In March 2010, Ben Ammi received a Lifetime Achievement Award in Ghana, West Africa. This award is given out by the Ghanaian Country Awards Council. At the ceremony, the Country Director of CACG (Country Awards Council Ghana) stated that Ben Ammi "has helped bridged the gap between spirituality and development like no other leader before in global history, in the process creating new and progressive options for successfully building communities and projects based on enduring righteous, African cultural principles."

BBC's "Focus on Africa" magazine in the year 2000 named him the "One of the Most Influential Africans of the Last Millennium".

See also
African-American – Jewish relations#Blacks as the chosen people
Black Hebrew Israelites
Groups claiming affiliation with Israelites

References

Further reading

External links
Ben Ammi
Statement issued by the Israeli Foreign Ministry (on 2006/09/29) on the Community that Ben Ammi is leading

1939 births
Black Hebrew Israelite religious leaders
American emigrants to Israel
2014 deaths
People from Chicago
Place of birth missing
Israeli people of African-American descent
Israeli religious leaders
Right-wing populism in the United States
Founders of new religious movements
20th-century African-American people
21st-century African-American people
Angelic visionaries
Self-declared messiahs